Terravision may refer to:

Terravision (computer program)
Terravision (Italian company)

See also
Terrorvision (disambiguation)